Good government is a normative description of how government is supposed to be constituted. It has been frequently employed by various political thinkers, ideologues and politicians.

Thomas Jefferson and good government 
Thomas Jefferson often referred to the term good government. In his opinion, the government ought to be judged by how well it meets its legitimate objectives. For him, a good government was the one that most effectively secures the rights of the people and the rewards of their labor, which promotes their happiness, and also does their will.  For instance, he said to Maryland Republicans in 1809: "The care of human life and happiness and not their destruction is the only legitimate object of good government."

Good government as a political slogan 

The political slogan "Good Government" was used in English-speaking countries in the late 19th and early 20th centuries. It appears in the Canadian political maxim "Peace, order and good government."

Like many other political slogans, its meaning is not literal, but was constructed to express a specific partisan stance, rather than being a common phrase which acquired a more obscure meaning by public mental association.

The phrase came into existence by those political groups who abhorred the results of the expansion of the political franchise, and who wanted to get those people out of office. Examples of its use in the United States were by all sorts of opponents of the Tammany Hall rule of New York City and by the old Yankee political elite who opposed the transfer of power to Irish immigrants in Boston. It was used in the 1930s by those opposed to the New Deal, and later by the opponents of increased governmental size around the time of the Great Society project. Those who so use this phrase are in turn called by their own opponents "Goo-goos".

The phrase was used by the Canadians to refer to their understanding that their British heritage (ties to the more experienced "Mother of Parliaments") would enable them to escape falling into such a condition, often called "mob rule".

See also
 Good governance
 Queen's peace

References 

 

Political catchphrases